Gilmour Kaltongga (born 5 April 1997) is a Vanuatuan cricketer who plays for the Vanuatu cricket team. In March 2019, he was named in the Vanuatuan squad for the Regional Finals of the 2018–19 ICC T20 World Cup East Asia-Pacific Qualifier tournament. He made his Twenty20 International (T20I) debut for Vanuatu against Papua New Guinea on 22 March 2019.

In June 2019, he was selected to represent the Vanuatu cricket team in the men's tournament at the 2019 Pacific Games.

References

External links
 

1997 births
Living people
Vanuatuan cricketers
Vanuatu Twenty20 International cricketers
Place of birth missing (living people)